Islamic Commercial Law by Mohammad Hashim Kamali, professor of law at the International Islamic University, Malaysia, is an analysis of options and futures contracts as trading tools from the point of view of shariah.

The book is divided into three parts: the first describes derivatives trading in its nuts-and-bolts in secular terms. The second part looks at the issue of whether futures trading is permissible in Islamic law, and concludes that it is, due to the principle of maslaha, i.e. consideration of the public interest. The third part of the book draws the same conclusion with regard to options.

Islamic literature
Islamic economic jurisprudence